Lodhéřov is a municipality and village in Jindřichův Hradec District in the South Bohemian Region of the Czech Republic. It has about 700 inhabitants.

Administrative parts
Villages of Najdek and Studnice are administrative parts of Lodhéřov.

References

Villages in Jindřichův Hradec District